The Mid Atlantic Arts Foundation (MAAF), headquartered in Baltimore, Maryland, is one of six not-for-profit regional arts organizations funded by the National Endowment for the Arts (NEA). Founded in 1979, MAAF works to "promote and support multi-state arts programming". The organization works in partnership with the state or territorial arts councils of Delaware, the District of Columbia, Maryland, New Jersey, New York, Pennsylvania, the US Virgin Islands, Virginia, and West Virginia.

References

External links
Mid Atlantic Arts Foundation 
US Regional Arts Organizations

Arts foundations based in the United States
Arts organizations based in Maryland
Organizations based in Baltimore
Arts organizations established in 1979
1979 establishments in the United States